The 13039 / 40 Howrah–Delhi Janata Express was an Express train belonging to Indian Railways – Eastern Railway zone that ran between  & Delhi Junction in India.

It operated as train number 13039 from Howrah Junction to Delhi Junction and as train number 13040 in the reverse direction, serving the states of West Bengal, Jharkhand, Bihar, Uttar Pradesh & Delhi.

Coaches

The 13039 / 40 Howrah–Delhi Janata Express had 2 Second Class seating, 7 General Unreserved, 2 SLR (Seating cum Luggage Rake) coaches & up to 8 High Capacity Parcel Vans. It does not carry a pantry car.

As is customary with most train services in India, coach composition may be amended at the discretion of Indian Railways depending on demand.

Service

The 13039 Howrah–Delhi Janata Express covered the distance of 1538 kilometres in 39 hours 25 mins (39.02 km/hr) & in 38 hours 35 mins as 13040 Delhi–Howrah Janata Express (39.86 km/hr).

As the average speed of the train was below , as per Indian Railways rules, its fare does not included a Superfast surcharge.

Routeing

Traction

As the route is fully electrified, an Asansol-based WAM-4 or a Howrah-based WAP-4 had powered the train for its entire journey.

Timings

13039 Howrah–Delhi Janata Express leaves Howrah Junction on a daily basis at 20:20 hrs IST and reaches Delhi Junction at 11:45 hrs IST on the 3rd day.

13040 Delhi–Howrah Janata Express leaves Delhi Junction on a daily basis at 15:30 hrs IST and reaches Howrah Junction at 06:05 hrs IST on the 3rd day.

References 

 http://www.er.indianrailways.gov.in/view_detail.jsp?lang=0&dcd=311&id=0,4,268

External links

Delhi–Kolkata trains
Express trains in India
Rail transport in Jharkhand
Rail transport in Bihar
Rail transport in Uttar Pradesh